The Burundi women's national football team, nicknamed the Swallows (French: Hirondelles), represents Burundi in women's international football competitions. The team has competed since 2016 in matches recognised by FIFA, the sport's international governing body. A senior national team has been continually inactive, but an under-20 team has played in numerous matches. Further development of football in the country faces challenges found across Africa, including inequality and limited access to education for women. A women's football programme did not exist in Burundi until 2000, and only 455 players had registered for participation on the national level by 2006.

History
In 1985, almost no country in the world had a women's national football team. While the sport grew in popularity worldwide in the ensuing years, Burundi did not have an official team until more than two decades later. By 2009, however, Burundi had a FIFA-recognised senior national team nicknamed the Swallows and a FIFA-recognised Burundi women's under-20 national team. The under-20 team played one international match in 2002, one in 2004 and one in 2006.

The senior national football team has never competed in a FIFA-sanctioned fixture and has not competed at the Women's World Cup. The team was one of 200 preparing for a qualification tournament for the cup in 2007, but did not play in the competition. The team has withdrawn from numerous other events. Burundi was to play in the 2008 African Women's Championship but withdrew from the tournament, giving the Democratic Republic of the Congo an automatic qualification. The team also withdrew from the 2010 and 2012 editions of the Africa Women Cup of Nations before the first-round qualifiers. Burundi has not participated in other major events on the continent, including the 2011 All-Africa Games. As of March 2012, the team was not ranked by FIFA.

Burundi was scheduled to participate in a competition in 2007 organised by the Confederation of African Football (CAF) in Zanzibar. Nicholas Musonye, the secretary of the Council for East and Central Africa Football Associations (Cecafa),  said of the event, "CAF wants to develop women's football in this region in recognition of the milestones Cecafa has achieved over the years. CAF appreciates what Cecafa has done despite the hardships the association has gone through, from financial problems to political instability in member states and poor management of associations. Member states in the Cecafa region have not taken women's football seriously. CAF now wants to sponsor a long-term campaign to attract women from this region into the game." The competition was canceled due to lack of funds.

Burundi's women's team was assembled in 2019 under coach Daniella Niyibimenya in anticipation of the 2019 CECAFA Women's Championship. The team was defeated 2–0 in a match with the Uganda women's national football team. Speaking on the team's lack of permanence and performance, Niyibimenya said, "We have a talented team but they need several warm-up matches to develop their character. Due to a lack of resources, we can only bring the girls together when a competition is announced."

Background and development

The development of women's football in Africa faces several challenges, including limited access to education, poverty amongst women, inequalities and human rights abuses.

The Football Federation of Burundi, the country's national association, created a woman's football programme in 2000. By 2006, there were just 455 registered women players, and the absence of a thriving women's game has been an obstacle for the national team. Lydia Nsekera is the head of the national football association.

Outside the national federation, the Commission nationale du football féminin was established by the 1990s, and a league and women's teams were organised in the same period in Bujumbura.

Results and fixtures

The following is a list of match results in the last 12 months, as well as any future matches that have been scheduled.

Legend

2022

2023
Source : global sport

Coaching staff

Current coaching staff

Manager history

  Gustave Niyonkuru (20xx–)

Players

Current squad
 This is the final squad named in May 2022 for 2022 Africa Women Cup of Nations tournament.
 Caps and goals accurate up to and including 30 October 2021.

Recent call-ups
The following players have been called up to a Burundi squad in the past 12 months.

 
 
 

 
 
 

 
 
 
 
 
 
 

INJ Player withdrew from the squad due to an injury.
PRE Preliminary squad.
SUS Player is serving a suspension.
WD Player withdrew for personal reasons.

Previous squads

Africa Women Cup of Nations
2022 Women's Africa Cup of Nations squads

CECAFA Women's Championship
2022 CECAFA Women's Championship squads

Competitive record
 Champions   Runners-up   Third place   Fourth place

Africa Women Cup of Nations

(The former format was amended as it did not comply with MOS:FLAG as discussed here)
*Draws include knockout matches decided on penalty kicks.

African Games

FIFA Women's World Cup

*Draws include knockout matches decided on penalty kicks.

CECAFA Women's Championship

Honours

Regional
CECAFA Women's Championship
  Runners-up:

All−time record against FIFA recognized nations
The list shown below shows the Djibouti national football team all−time international record against opposing nations.
*As of xxxxxx after match against xxxx.
Key

Record per opponent
*As ofxxxxx after match against xxxxx.
Key

The following table shows Djibouti's all-time official international record per opponent:

See also

Football in Burundi
Women's football in Africa
African Nations Cup

References

External links
Association page at fifa.com

African women's national association football teams
Burundi women's national football team